George Alexander Drew,  (February 21, 1826 – July 5, 1891) was a Canadian lawyer, judge and political figure. He represented Wellington North in the House of Commons of Canada as a Liberal-Conservative member from 1867 to 1872 and from 1878 to 1882.

He was born near Williamstown, Upper Canada, the son of John Drew and Margaret McKay, and was educated there and in Cornwall. Drew studied law with John Sandfield Macdonald in Cornwall, was called to the bar in 1854 and set up practice in Elora.  In 1856, he married Elizabeth Mary Jacob; in 1865, after his first wife's death, he married her sister, Maria Louise. Drew was named Queen's Counsel in 1872.

Drew ran unsuccessfully against Nathaniel Higinbotham for the federal seat in 1872, 1874 and 1875 before defeating him in 1878. In 1882, he was named judge for Wellington County; later that same year, he was named judge in the High Court of Justice for Ontario. Drew died while still a judge at the age of 65.

The community of Drew in Minto Township was named after him.

His grandson, George Drew, later served as Premier of Ontario.

References 

1826 births
1891 deaths
Conservative Party of Canada (1867–1942) MPs
Members of the House of Commons of Canada from Ontario
Judges in Ontario
Canadian King's Counsel